The George Hotel is a hotel and former coaching inn in the town of Reading in the English county of Berkshire. It is situated in the eastern end of the town centre, on the corner of King Street and Minster Street, next to The Oracle shopping mall. It is a Grade II listed building.

History 

First mentioned in 1423, the George Inn was one of the busiest in Reading in the late 16th century. It was one of the major coaching inns between London and the West Country in the 18th century.

Gallery

References

External links 

NilVip Hotels Group website
Mercure website

Coaching inns
Hotel buildings completed in the 19th century
Hotels in Reading, Berkshire
Tourist attractions in Reading, Berkshire